Brachycarenus is a genus of bugs in the family Rhopalidae and the tribe Rhopalini, erected by Franz Xaver Fieber in 1860.  
The species Brachycarenus tigrinus is recorded from much of Europe (but also Korea and North America); the British Isles, where it was a fairly recent (2003) introduction.

Species 
According to BioLib the following are included:
 Brachycarenus languidus (Horváth, 1891)
 Brachycarenus tigrinus (Schilling, 1829)

See also
 List of heteropteran bugs recorded in Britain

References

External links
 
 

Pentatomomorpha genera
Hemiptera of Europe
Rhopalini